Sandvig is a surname. Notable people with the surname include:

 (1752–1786 ), Danish historian
Anders Sandvig (1862–1950), Norwegian dentist 
Bente Sandvig, Norwegian politician
Dagmar Sandvig (1921–1989), Norwegian politician 
Helene Sandvig (born 1968), Norwegian journalist
Jake Sandvig (born 1986), American actor